Elitserien is the senior of the two water polo leagues in Sweden, the other one being Allsvenskan. Elitserien consists of a regular season of six matches after which a round of final four playoffs us held between the four best teams. A semi-finals is then held between the first and the fourth team and the second and third of the final four round. The final match will then be played between the winner and second team of the semi-finals. The two last teams in the regular season will meet the first and second teams respectively from Allsvenskan in qualifying matches for next year's Elitserien.

List of champions 
The following list presents the annual winners of men's Elitserien since the establishment of the Swedish Swimming Federation.

1906 – Stockholms KK
1907 – Stockholms KK
1908 – Stockholms KK
1909 – Stockholms KK
1910 – Stockholms KK
1911 – Stockholms KK
1912 – Stockholms KK
1913 – Stockholms KK
1914 – Stockholms KK
1915 – Stockholms KK
1916 – Stockholms KK
1917 – Stockholms KK
1918 – Stockholms KK
1919 – Stockholms KK
1920 – Stockholms KK
1921 – Stockholms KK
1922 – Stockholms KK
1923 – Stockholms KK
1924 – Stockholms KK
1925 – SK Neptun
1926 – SK Neptun
1927 – Stockholms KK
1928 – SK Neptun
1929 – Stockholms KK
1930 – Stockholms KK
1931 – Stockholms KK
1932 – SK Neptun
1933 – Stockholms KK
1934 – SoIK Hellas
1935 – SK Neptun
1936 – Stockholms KK
1937 – Stockholms KK
1938 – Stockholms KK
1939 – Stockholms KK
1940 – Stockholms KK
1941 – SK Neptun
1942 – SoIK Hellas
1943 – SoIK Hellas
1944 – Stockholms KK
1945 – Stockholms KK
1946 – SoIK Hellas
1947 – SoIK Hellas
1948 – SoIK Hellas
1949 – SoIK Hellas
1950 – SoIK Hellas
1951 – SoIK Hellas
1952 – SoIK Hellas
1953 – SoIK Hellas
1954 – SoIK Hellas
1955 – SoIK Hellas
1956 – SoIK Hellas
1957 – SoIK Hellas
1958 – SoIK Hellas
1959 – SoIK Hellas
1960 – SoIK Hellas
1961 – Stockholms KK
1962 – Stockholms KK
1963 – Tunafors SK
1964 – Tunafors SK
1965 – Tunafors SK
1966 – Tunafors SK
1967 – Tunafors SK
1968 – Stockholms KK
1969 – Stockholms KK
1970 – Stockholms KK
1971 – Stockholms KK
1972 – Stockholms KK
1973 – Stockholms KK
1974 – Stockholms KK
1975 – Stockholms KK
1976 – Västerås SS
1977 – Västerås SS
1978 – Stockholms KK
1979 – Stockholms KK
1980 – Stockholms KK
1981 – GKKN
1982 – Stockholms KK
1983 – SK Neptun
1984 – SK Neptun
1985 – Stockholms KK
1986 – Stockholms KK
1987 – SK Neptun
1988 – Stockholms KK
1989 – StockholmsPolisens IF VattenpoloFörening
1990 – Stockholms KK
1991 – Stockholms KK
1992 – Stockholms KK
1993 – Stockholms KK
1994 – Stockholms KK
1995 – Stockholms KK
1996 – StockholmsPolisens IF VattenpoloFörening
1997 – StockholmsPolisens IF VattenpoloFörening
1998 – Stockholms KK
1999 – Stockholms KK
2000 – Stockholms KK
2001 – Stockholms KK
2002 – Stockholms KK
2003 – Stockholms KK
2004 – Stockholms KK
2005 – Stockholms KK
2006 – SoIK Hellas
2007 – SoIK Hellas
2008 – SK Ran
2009 – SoIK Hellas
2010 – Järfälla Simsällskap
2011 – Järfälla Simsällskap
2012 – Järfälla Simsällskap
2013 – Järfälla Simsällskap
2014 – SoIK Hellas
2015 – Järfälla Simsällskap
2016 – Linköpings Simidrottsförening

References

Water polo leagues in Europe
Sports leagues in Sweden
Water polo competitions in Sweden
Professional sports leagues in Sweden